Belgrade–Banja Luka is a road bicycle race held annually in Serbia and Bosnia and Herzegovina respectively. It is made up of two stages; Belgrade–Banja Luka I and Belgrade–Banja Luka II and is organized as a 2.1 event on the UCI Europe Tour. First race was organized in 2007.

About

Belgrade Banja Luka started for the first time in 2007, and it has been included in the calendar of the World Cycling Union "UCI" the same year. The race attracted a large number of teams from all over the world, and today it's a universal event and one of the largest sporting events in Bosnia and Herzegovina and Serbia.
The Belgrade Banja Luka Race is an event of the highest public interest for the promotion of sports in Republika Srpska and Serbia. The race was declared by the Republic of Serbia Government and the Government of the "Republika Srpska" to be an event of the highest importance for the Republika Srpska and Serbia.
Small Chronology of Event:
2019: 16 cities and municipalities were involved in the race. Increased number of stages from two (2) to four stages (4)

2018: The race is listed in the first international event category of UCI 2.1, which indicates that today it is ranked with the largest races in the world such as "Tour de France", "Giro d'Italia" ...
2017: A record number of media and broadcasters transmit and report from the Race. A total of 8 broadcasters and 80 journalists from home and abroad. The viewership of the Race was 8% in the country and 4% abroad. The same year the Race was declared as the largest media sporting event.
2016: RTRS broadcasts the race live for the first time. The viewership index was 10% in BiH, which means that the broadcast was watched by over 300,000 people, while the viewership index in the region was 2%, which indicates that the race was followed by 0.5 million people.

2015: A record was broken in the number of participating countries and the number of riders: 190 riders from 30 countries. The race entered the hundred (100) best organized cycling events of all time and it was qualified for the 2016 Rio Olympics
• 2014: Award for the biggest sports event in Banja Luka.
• 2013: Entering the top ten races in the world for 2013.
• 2012: Breaking the record of the former Yugoslavia with 182 starters from 25 countries.
• 2011: The title of the fastest UCI race in the world in 2011.
• 2010: Breaking the live event record for one sporting event, 60,000 people followed the race.
• 2009: The race enters the professional category with over 75% of professional teams from all over the world.
• 2008: 9 Mayors and 3 Ministers of Sport from Serbia, Republika Srpska and Slovenia attended opening ceremony for the Race.

Winners

Belgrade–Banja Luka I

Belgrade–Banja Luka II

Belgrade–Banja Luka UCI 2.1

References

UCI Europe Tour races
Cycle races in Serbia
Recurring sporting events established in 2009
Cycle races in Bosnia and Herzegovina
Spring (season) events in Bosnia and Herzegovina
Spring (season) events in Serbia